Baraúnda was the wife of the Garifuna leader Satuyé. Her resistance to colonial rule is celebrated in oral tradition in Honduras and Belize, in songs sung by Garifuna women.

References

18th-century births
Year of death missing
Garifuna people